Ronald Vance Mathis (born September 25, 1958) is a former professional baseball player.  He was a right-handed pitcher over parts of two seasons (1985, 1987) with the Houston Astros.  For his career, he compiled a 3-6 record, with a 5.93 earned run average, and 42 strikeouts in 82 innings pitched.

An alumnus of the University of Missouri, Mathis was born in Kansas City, Missouri.

External links

Venezuelan Professional Baseball League

1958 births
Albuquerque Dukes players
Baseball players from Kansas City, Missouri
Birmingham Barons players
Bristol Tigers players
Colorado Springs Sky Sox players
Columbus Astros players
Houston Astros players
Leones del Caracas players
American expatriate baseball players in Venezuela
Living people
Macon Peaches players
Major League Baseball pitchers
Montgomery Rebels players
San Antonio Missions players
Tucson Toros players
Missouri Tigers baseball players